Potassium fulminate is the potassium salt of the fulminate ion.  Its only use, aside from chemical demonstrations, is in the percussion caps for some early rifles. Usually prepared by reacting a potassium amalgam with mercury fulminate, it is much less sensitive due to the ionic bond between potassium and carbon, unlike the weaker covalent bond between mercury and carbon.

See also
 List of explosives
 Fulminic acid
 Fulminate
 Silver fulminate
 Mercury(II) fulminate
 Potassium cyanate

References

Potassium compounds
Fulminates